FC Torpedo Zaporizhzhia is a former professional football team based in Zaporizhzhia, Ukraine.

History
Founded in 1982, the club played in the Ukrainian Premier League from 1992 through 1998, after being initially chosen to participate for being one of the top 9 (of 11) Ukrainian teams from the West Division of the Soviet Second League in 1991. Prior to 1982 there were number of the Torpedo predecessors among which "Komunarivets", "Traktor", "Mashynobudivnyk", and others.

Torpedo Zaporizhzhia's best achievement in the Ukrainian Premier League was 7th place (thrice, in 1992 (prorated), 1994–95, and 1995–96). The club has successfully competing in the domestic cup competition in early years being eliminated only in semi-finals twice in a row and reaching the best of eight the next year. In April 1996 the club's creator (Stepan Kravchun) and the factory general director was removed from governing of the club which had reflected in further club's performance.

Following relegation during the 1997–98 season, Torpedo Zaporizhzhia competed successfully in the Ukrainian First League, taking third place and achieving promotion back to the Ukrainian Premier League. However despite this finish, the club applied for bankruptcy following the conclusion of the 1998–99 season and were suspended by the Ukrainian Football Association. In early March 2000 in press media appeared information that the club may cease its operations because the Professional Football League of Ukraine received a letter from the club's president Serhiy Kharhenko which informed that the team is withdrawing from the 1999–2000 season due to lack of financing. The club returned to the Ukrainian Second League in 2002 and 2003, but was relegated to the amateur league thereafter.

FC Torpedo Zaporizhzhia played its games at the AutoZAZ Stadium with maximum capacity of 15,000.

In 2002–03 under Torpedo Zaporizhzhia brand played a football team of the Zaporizhzhia Institute of State and Municipal Administration (ZIGMU), formerly FC Viktor Zaporizhzhia. After relegation the team was renamed into ZIGMU-Spartak Zaporizhzhia and continued to play in regional competitions.

Colours are white shirts, blue shorts.

Honours
 Cup of the Ukrainian SSR (1, amateur): 1984
 Champion of the Ukrainian SSR (1): 1990

League and cup history

 Soviet Union
{|class="wikitable"
|-bgcolor="#efefef"
! Season
! Div.
! Pos.
! Pl.
! W
! D
! L
! GS
! GA
! P
!Domestic Cup
!colspan=2|Europe
!Notes
|-
|align=center|1985
|align=center|3rd
|align=center|24
|align=center|40
|align=center|10
|align=center|14
|align=center|16
|align=center|39
|align=center|44
|align=center|34
|align=center|
|align=center|
|align=center|
|align=center|VI ZoneGroup 2 (12 place)
|-
|align=center|1986
|align=center|3rd
|align=center|9
|align=center|40
|align=center|17
|align=center|7
|align=center|16
|align=center|49
|align=center|47
|align=center|41
|align=center|
|align=center|
|align=center|
|align=center|VI ZoneGroup 2 (6 place)
|-
|align=center|1987
|align=center|3rd
|align=center|20
|align=center|52
|align=center|12
|align=center|16
|align=center|24
|align=center|54
|align=center|81
|align=center|40
|align=center|
|align=center|
|align=center|
|align=center|VI Zone
|-
|align=center|1988
|align=center|3rd
|align=center|24
|align=center|50
|align=center|13
|align=center|12
|align=center|25
|align=center|55
|align=center|71
|align=center|38
|align=center|
|align=center|
|align=center|
|align=center|VI Zone
|-
|align=center|1989
|align=center|3rd
|align=center bgcolor=pink|13
|align=center|52
|align=center|19
|align=center|12
|align=center|21
|align=center|51
|align=center|62
|align=center|50
|align=center|
|align=center|
|align=center|
|align=center bgcolor=pink|RelegatedVI Zone
|-
|align=center|1990
|align=center|4th
|align=center bgcolor=gold|1
|align=center|36
|align=center|23
|align=center|8
|align=center|5
|align=center|53
|align=center|25
|align=center|54
|align=center|
|align=center|
|align=center|
|align=center bgcolor=green|PromotedI Zone
|-
|align=center|1991
|align=center|3rd
|align=center|7
|align=center|42
|align=center|18
|align=center|10
|align=center|14
|align=center|63
|align=center|50
|align=center|46
|align=center|
|align=center|
|align=center|
|align=center|West Zone
|}

 Ukraine
{|class="wikitable"
|-bgcolor="#efefef"
! Season
! Div.
! Pos.
! Pl.
! W
! D
! L
! GS
! GA
! P
!Domestic Cup
!colspan=2|Europe
!Notes
|-
|align=center|1992
|align=center|1st
|align=center|4
|align=center|18
|align=center|6
|align=center|7
|align=center|5
|align=center|21
|align=center|26
|align=center|19
|align=center bgcolor=tan|1/2 finals
|align=center|
|align=center|
|align=center|Group A
|-
|align=center|1992–93
|align=center|1st
|align=center|13
|align=center|30
|align=center|9
|align=center|7
|align=center|14
|align=center|32
|align=center|40
|align=center|25
|align=center bgcolor=tan|1/2 finals
|align=center|
|align=center|
|align=center|
|-
|align=center|1993–94
|align=center|1st
|align=center|13
|align=center|34
|align=center|9
|align=center|10
|align=center|15
|align=center|27
|align=center|39
|align=center|28
|align=center|1/4
|align=center|
|align=center|
|align=center|
|-
|align=center|1994–95
|align=center|1st
|align=center|7
|align=center|34
|align=center|15
|align=center|3
|align=center|16
|align=center|49
|align=center|49
|align=center|48
|align=center|1/8
|align=center|
|align=center|
|align=center|
|-
|align=center|1995–96
|align=center|1st
|align=center|7
|align=center|34
|align=center|15
|align=center|3
|align=center|16
|align=center|40
|align=center|45
|align=center|48
|align=center|1/8
|align=center|
|align=center|
|align=center|
|-
|align=center|1996–97
|align=center|1st
|align=center|14
|align=center|30
|align=center|8
|align=center|5
|align=center|17
|align=center|25
|align=center|56
|align=center|29
|align=center|1/8
|align=center|
|align=center|
|align=center|
|-
|align=center|1997–98
|align=center|1st
|align=center bgcolor=pink|16
|align=center|30
|align=center|2
|align=center|7
|align=center|21
|align=center|20
|align=center|69
|align=center|13
|align=center|1/8
|align=center|
|align=center|
|align=center bgcolor=pink|Relegated
|-
|align=center|1998–99
|align=center|2nd
|align=center bgcolor=tan|3
|align=center|38
|align=center|24
|align=center|5
|align=center|9
|align=center|55
|align=center|29
|align=center|77
|align=center|1/32
|align=center|
|align=center|
|align=center|Filed a bankruptcy
|-
|align=center|1999-00
|align=center|2nd
|align=center bgcolor=pink|18
|align=center|34
|align=center|5
|align=center|1
|align=center|28
|align=center|21
|align=center|32
|align=center|16
|align=center|1/16
|align=center|
|align=center|
|align=center bgcolor=pink|Reinstated after the bankruptcyRelegated and Folded
|-
|align=center|2001–02
|align=center|3rd
|align=center|15
|align=center|34
|align=center|7
|align=center|10
|align=center|17
|align=center|22
|align=center|57
|align=center|31
|align=center|1/16*
|align=center|
|align=center|
|align=center|Reinstated second time
|-
|align=center|2002–03
|align=center|3rd
|align=center bgcolor=pink|16
|align=center|30
|align=center|4
|align=center|7
|align=center|19
|align=center|19
|align=center|52
|align=center|19
|align=center|1/32
|align=center|
|align=center|
|align=center bgcolor=pink|Relegated
|}

See also
 FC Metalurh Zaporizhzhia
 FC Silmash Zaporizhzhia
 FC Viktor Zaporizhzhia

References

External links
 Pavlenko, Ihor. The father of football-type "Torpedo" (Отец футбольного "Торпедо"). Footboom. 5 March 2018

 
Torpedo Zaporizhzhia, FC
Torpedo Zaporizhzhia
1982 establishments in Ukraine
Association football clubs disestablished in 2003
Association football clubs established in 1982
2003 disestablishments in Ukraine
Manufacturing association football clubs in Ukraine